Mélissa Busque (born 18 February 1990) is a Canadian soccer player.

Busque was born in Montreal, Quebec in Canada and played college soccer with Connecticut Huskies and also played with the Seattle Redhawks. She began her professional career with Ottawa Fury, before moving to Seattle Sounders in 2013. Between 2014 and 2015, Busque has had five spells with three clubs. Firstly joining Laval Comets in 2014, then leaving to sign for German Bundesliga club Herfoder SV before returning to Laval later that year. After spending more time with Laval, Busque was on the move again as she joined another Bundesliga club in Sand. Her spells with both German sides were unsuccessful as she failed to make an appearance for Herforder or Sand before again returning to Laval.

Busque has won three caps with the Canadian national team. She has also played futsal.

Early life
Busque was born in Quebec, Canada. She is the daughter of Rejean Busque and Ginette Blouin. She graduated from the Collège Français Longueuil, before enrolling at the University of Connecticut in 2008 where she studied sports management before leaving to go to Seattle University in 2012 where she studied Psychology.

Career

Club

Youth, 1995–2008
Busque started her career at the age of five with Saint-Bruno. She stayed with Saint-Bruno from 1995 until 2008 when she started college soccer with Connecticut Huskies and Seattle Redhawks. She played with Connecticut from 2008 to 2011 and made a total of sixty-five appearances for the team, whilst scoring ten goals and assisting fourteen. After three strong years with Connecticut, she next moved to the Seattle Redhawks. During her months with Seattle, she made twenty appearances and scored four goals while providing four assists.

Ottawa Fury, 2009–2013
Busque joined her first North American W-League team, Ottawa Fury, in 2009 where she remained for three years. During her time with Ottawa, she won 2011 W-League Central Conference and 2011 W-League Central Conference Play-offs but lost in the Championship final 6–1 to Atlanta Silverbacks. She left Ottawa in April 2013, she made thirty-three appearances and scored twelve goals and participated in three division titles, two conference championships, two final four appearances, and played in two championship matches.

Seattle Sounders, 2013–2014
On 23 April 2013, Busque joined Seattle Sounders. She had been on trial beforehand and featured in a friendly match against Oregon State Beavers where she impressed Seattle's assistant coach Zahra Lechak. In 2013, she was selected in the USL W-League All-Star team following an online survey. After playing in thirty matches for Seattle and scoring seven goals, Busque moved clubs again as she left Seattle on 1 May 2014.

Laval Comets to Herforder and back to Laval, 2014
Following her departure from Seattle, Busque signed for Laval Comets on 1 May 2014 but made just one appearance before leaving for newly promoted German Bundesliga club Herfoder SV on 18 June. However, after delaying her move to the club on numerous occasions the club decided to cancel her contract on 2 August. She failed to make an appearance for Herforder. She rejoined Laval Comets where she made ten appearances before leaving again in 2015.

Sand, 2015
2015 was more of the same for Busque as she moved back to the Bundesliga but this time agreed to join Sand in January 2015. Despite spending six months with Sand, Busque didn't make a single appearance for the club and left to rejoin Laval Comets for the third time in her career.

Laval Comets, 2015
After returning to Laval for a third time in 2015, Busque made twelve appearances for the club.

FC Sélect Rive-Sud, 2018
Busque made a return to soccer in May 2018 by joining Première Ligue de soccer du Québec side FC Sélect Rive-Sud.

CS Fabrose, 2019
In 2019, after leaving FC Sélect Rive-Sud, Busque signed with fellow PLSQ team CS Fabrose on a part-time basis.

International
Throughout her career, Busque has made three senior appearances for the Canada women's national soccer team. Her three caps have come in matches against Germany, South Korea and Mexico. Before making the step up to senior internationals, Busque represented Canada at Under-15, Under-16 and Under-20 level and made seven appearances overall.

Futsal career
Busque featured in the Première Ligue de Futsal du Québec for Xtreme ADR in 2016. In early 2019, Busque played for the Quebec women's futsal team in friendly wins over their Belgium counterparts.

Career statistics

Club
.

International

Honours
Busque has won two club honours and one individual honour during her career. She won the 2011 W-League Central Conference and 2011 W-League Central Conference Play-offs with Ottawa Fury. She was selected in the All-Star team in the 2013 W-League season during her time with Seattle Sounders.

Club
Ottawa Fury
W-League Central Conference: 2011
W-League Central Conference Play-offs: 2011

Individual
Seattle Sounders
W-League All-Star: 2013

References

External links 
 
 
 Mélissa Busque (FC Sélect Rive-Sud) - YouTube

1990 births
Living people
Soccer players from Montreal
Seattle Sounders Women players
Canadian women's soccer players
Canada women's international soccer players
Women's association football midfielders
University of Connecticut alumni
Seattle University alumni
Canadian expatriate women's soccer players
Expatriate women's footballers in Germany
UConn Huskies women's soccer players
Seattle Redhawks women's soccer players
Canadian women's futsal players
Ottawa Fury (women) players
USL W-League (1995–2015) players
Laval Comets players